John Oliver was an Anglican priest, most notably Archdeacon of Ardagh from 1762 until his death in 1778.

The son of Robert Oliver of Castle Oliver, he was educated at Trinity College, Dublin. He married Elizabeth, the sixth child and fourth daughter of Archbishop John Ryder. One of his sons was an admiral; and another a general.

Notes

Alumni of Trinity College Dublin
18th-century Irish Anglican priests
Archdeacons of Ardagh
1778 deaths